Nushagak was a trade center and settlement near the present-day site of Dillingham, Alaska, United States, at the northern end of Nushagak Bay in northern Bristol Bay. It was located near the confluence of the Wood River and Nushagak Rivers.

History

The area was inhabited by Yup'ik people and Athabaskan peoples. In 1818 Russians built the post of Alexandrovski Redoubt (Post) there.  A Russian Orthodox mission was established there in 1837, by which time the community was known as Nushagak.  Nushagak became a place where different Alaska Native groups from the Kuskokwim River, the Alaska Peninsula and Cook Inlet came to trade or live.

In 1881, after the Alaska Purchase by the United States, the United States Signal Corps built a weather station at Nushagak.  The first salmon cannery in the Bristol Bay region was constructed by Arctic Packing Company in 1883 at Kanulik, just east of Nushagak Point. Several other canneries followed, two of which were at Nushagak Point.

The Pacific Steam Whaling Company built a cannery there in 1899 with Crescent Porter Hale as its first superintendent.  It was bought by Pacific Packing and Navigation Co in 1901 and after its demise, Northwestern Fisheries Co. in 1904. Pacific American Fisheries bought the property in 1933 along with others in the region but never operated the Nushagak cannery.  It was leased to Lowes Trading Company in 1936 and closed after the 1937 season following death of Lowes' manager, Alex Bradford, and reports of financial difficulties.  The second cannery built in 1899 was owned by the Alaska Fisherman's Packing Co. It was bought by Libby, McNeill and Libby in 1916 and operated until 1936.

Despite the commanding position that the Point offered over the entire upper Nushagak Bay, it suffered from extensive and growing mud flats that limited access to vessels except during the bay's extreme high tides. Nushagak Point remains the location of some productive salmon set net sites. Artifacts from the cannery era, such as donkey engines, still remain.

The world wide influenza pandemic of 1918 devastated the region in 1919, and contributed to the depopulation of Nushagak. After the epidemic a hospital and orphanage were established in Kanakanak, across the river and 6 miles (10 km) from the present-day city center of Dillingham.

Demographics

Nushagak first reported on the 1880 U.S. Census as an unincorporated village (spelled "Nushegak" and with the alternative name of "Alexandrovsk.") It reported 178 residents, of which 91 were Inuit, 86 were Creole (Mixed Russian and Native) and 1 White. In 1890, it reported as Nushagak, which also included the weather station, Nushagak Cannery & Hunters Camp. It had 268 residents, of which a plurality (99) were Asian (imported workers for the canneries), 85 were Natives, 64 were White and 20 were Creole.

In 1900, it reported 324 residents, but did not return the racial demographics. With the closure of the canneries, the population dropped precipitously. It did not report again after the 1940 census, though the Geographical Survey Professional Paper on Alaska reported an unofficial population of 7 in 1958.

Notes

Further reading

Former populated places in Alaska
Geography of Dillingham Census Area, Alaska
Ghost towns in Alaska
Unincorporated communities in Dillingham Census Area, Alaska